Worth Township is located in Woodford County, Illinois. As of the 2010 census, its population was 8,741 and it contained 3,212 housing units.

The largest named community in Worth Township is the village of Germantown Hills.

Geography

Demographics

References

External links
City-data.com
Illinois State Archives

Townships in Woodford County, Illinois
Peoria metropolitan area, Illinois
Townships in Illinois